The 1938 Cleveland Rams season was the team's second year with the National Football League and the third season in Cleveland.

Schedule

Standings

References
1938 Cleveland Rams Season at Pro-Football Reference

Cleveland Rams
Cleveland Rams seasons
Cleveland Rams